Cumnock is a closed railway station on the Molong–Dubbo railway line in New South Wales, Australia. The station opened in 1925 and is now closed.

References

Disused regional railway stations in New South Wales
Railway stations in Australia opened in 1925